Missouri elected its representative to the United States House of Representatives for the 1828–1830 term on August 4, 1828.

See also 
 1828 and 1829 United States House of Representatives elections
 List of United States representatives from Missouri

Bibliography
 
 
 
 
 
 

1828
Missouri
United States House of Representatives